Andranomena is a commune in northern Madagascar. It belongs to the district of Andapa, which is a part of Sava Region. According to 2001 census the population of Andranomena was 4,038.

Only primary schooling is available in town. The majority 94% of the population are farmers.  The most important crop is rice, while other important products are beans and vanilla.  Industry and services provide employment for 5% and 1% of the population, respectively.

References and notes 

Populated places in Sava Region